Abagrotis hermina is a moth of the family Noctuidae first described by J. Donald Lafontaine in 1998. It is found in Canada (Manitoba, Saskatchewan, Alberta and British Columbia) and the United States, including Utah and California.

The wingspan is about 31 mm.

External links

hermina
Moths of North America
Moths described in 1998